Skarvanfjellet  is a mountain in Buskerud, in southern Norway.

Mountains of Viken